Nancibella is a genus of air-breathing land snails or semislugs, terrestrial pulmonate gastropod mollusks in the family Euconulidae.

Species
Species within the genus Nancibella include:
 Nancibella quintalia (Cox, 1870)

References

External links
 Iredale, T. (1945). The land Mollusca of Norfolk Island. The Australian Zoologist. 11: 46-71 
 Nomenclator Zoologicus info

 
Euconulidae
Taxonomy articles created by Polbot